Bilyalovo (Bilal) is a rural locality (a selo) and the administrative centre of Bilyalovsky Selsoviet, Baymaksky District, Bashkortostan, Russia. The population was 711 as of 2010. There are 9 streets.

Geography 
Bilyalovo is located 67 km north of Baymak (the district's administrative centre) by road. Semyonovo is the nearest rural locality.

References 

Rural localities in Baymaksky District